County Louth, otherwise known as Louth County or Louth, is a former parliamentary constituency in Ireland, which was represented in the  House of Commons of the Parliament of the United Kingdom.  From 1801 to 1885 it returned two Members of Parliament (MPs), and one from 1918 to 1922.

Boundaries 
From 1801 to 1885, the constituency comprised the whole of County Louth, except for the parliamentary boroughs of Drogheda and Dundalk. Between 1885 and 1918 the county was divided into the county division constituencies North Louth and South Louth. In 1918, the reunited constituency covered the entire county of Louth plus a small part of County Meath near Drogheda.

History 
Louth was a constituency in the first Dáil election in December 1918 when Sinn Féin won by 255 votes, its narrowest margin of victory in that election. John J. O'Kelly, a native of Kerry, resident in Glasnevin (Dublin), was Louth's first TD. The constituency was merged with Meath to form the 5 seat Louth–Meath constituency for the 2nd and 3rd Dála. In 1923 Louth became a new 3 seat constituency.

Members of Parliament

MPs 1801–85

MPs 1918–22

Elections

Elections in the 1830s

 
 
 
  

 
 

Dawson's death caused a by-election.

 

 
 

FitzGerald's death caused a by-election.

Elections in the 1840s
Chester resigned by accepting the office of Steward of the Chiltern Hundreds, causing a by-election.

Elections in the 1850s

 
 
 

Fortescue was appointed a Lord Commissioner of the Treasury, requiring a by-election.

Elections in the 1860s
Bellew resigned after he was appointed a law commissioner, causing a by-election.

 

 

 
 

Parkinson-Fortescue was appointed Chief Secretary for Ireland, requiring a by-election.

Parkinson-Fortescue was appointed Chief Secretary for Ireland, requiring a by-election.

Elections in the 1870s

 
 
 

Callan was also elected MP for Dundalk and opted to sit there.

Elections in the 1880s

 

Sullivan declined to take the seat, causing a by-election.

Elections in the 1910s

References 

The Parliaments of England by Henry Stooks Smith (1st edition published in three volumes 1844–50), 2nd edition edited (in one volume) by F.W.S. Craig (Political Reference Publications 1973)

 "County Louth: the Irish political revolution and the 1918 general election" by O. S. Kelly (MA thesis, 2006, UCD)

Westminster constituencies in County Louth (historic)
Dáil constituencies in the Republic of Ireland (historic)
Constituencies of the Parliament of the United Kingdom established in 1801
Constituencies of the Parliament of the United Kingdom disestablished in 1885
Constituencies of the Parliament of the United Kingdom established in 1918
Constituencies of the Parliament of the United Kingdom disestablished in 1922